Elections to Chorley Borough Council were held on 4 May 2006.  One third of the council was up for election and the Conservative party gained overall control of the council from no overall control.

After the election, the composition of the council was:

Election result

One Labour councillor was unopposed.

Results Map

Ward results

Adlington and Anderton ward

Astley and Buckshaw ward

Chisnall ward

Chorley East ward

Chorley North East ward

Chorley North West ward

Chorley South East ward

Chorley South West ward

Clayton le Woods and Whittle-le-Woods ward

Clayton le Woods North ward

Clayton le Woods West and Cuerden

Coppull ward

Eccleston and Mawdesley ward

Euxton North ward

Euxton South ward

Pennine ward

Wheelton and Withnell ward

References
2006 Chorley election result
Election Results 2006
Local election focus - Lancashire

2006 English local elections
2006
2000s in Lancashire